The Edward Frisbie House is a historic house at 699 East Main Street in Branford, Connecticut.  Probably built about 1750, it is a fine local example of Georgian residential architecture, historically attributed to one of the area's early settlers.  It was listed on the National Register of Historic Places in 1988.

Description and history
The Edward Frisbie House is located in eastern Branford, on the south side of East Main Street (United States Route 1) near its junction with Baldwin Drive.  It is a -story wood-frame structure, with a gabled roof, central chimney, and clapboarded exterior.  A single-story shed-roof porch extends across the right side, with chamfered square posts and arched valances between them.  The main facade faces north, and is five bays wide, with sash windows arranged symmetrically around the center entrance. The entrance is framed by a moulded surround with flared corners, and has a four-light transom window.  The property includes a barn that also exhibits early construction techniques.

The house has historically been said to be the home of Edward Frisbie, one of the original grantees of land that is now Branford, and was assigned a construction date of about 1685, based on his will.  However, architectural evidence of the construction techniques used suggest a Second Period construction date, probably c. 1750.  The house is a particularly well-preserved example of 18th-century architecture, one of a modest number of such surviving houses in the town.

See also
National Register of Historic Places listings in New Haven County, Connecticut

References

National Register of Historic Places in New Haven County, Connecticut
Houses on the National Register of Historic Places in Connecticut
Colonial architecture in the United States
Houses completed in 1750
Houses in Branford, Connecticut